Urška Poje (born 10 May 1997) is a Slovenian former biathlete. She competed in the 2014/15 World Cup season, and represented Slovenia at the Biathlon World Championships 2015 in Kontiolahti.

References

External links 
 

1997 births
Living people
People from Postojna
Slovenian female biathletes
Biathletes at the 2018 Winter Olympics
Olympic biathletes of Slovenia